Jalal al-Din castle is a historical castle located in Jajarm County in North Khorasan Province, The longevity of this fortress dates back to the Historical periods after Islam.

References 

Castles in Iran